Andoniaina Andriamalala (born March 8, 1985) is a Malagasy footballer currently plays for CNaPS. He represented the Madagascar national team during 2010 FIFA World Cup qualification and at the 2019 Indian Ocean Island Games.

External links
 
 

1985 births
Living people
Malagasy footballers
Madagascar international footballers
Association football goalkeepers
Ajesaia players
CNaPS Sport players
Madagascar A' international footballers
2022 African Nations Championship players